Johnny Silver (born John Silverman; April 16, 1918 – February 1, 2003) was an American actor and singer, best known for playing Benny Southstreet in Guys and Dolls.

Career
Born in East Chicago, Indiana, Silver's performing arts career started early, singing as a youth, and then expanded to acting. His early career involved performing with actor John Raitt at L.A. City College as well as radio work. He also worked as a burlesque comic.

During World War II, Silver was tasked with finding entertainment for the troops, and as a result, he met singer Mario Lanza. Silver helped Lanza secure a part in a play written by Peter Lind Hayes and Frank Loesser, On the Beam, and together they performed a number of variety acts for the troops.

Following the war, Silver moved to New York, and his big break came when he was cast as Benny Southstreet in Loesser's Broadway musical, Guys and Dolls, in 1950. He reprised the role for the film adaptation five years later.

Over the next 40 years, Silver worked prolifically as a character actor in film and on television. His film credits include Who's Been Sleeping in My Bed? (1963), The Great Race (1965), Lepke (1975), History of the World, Part I (1981) and Spaceballs (1987). Among his dozens of television credits, he appeared in seven episodes of Make Room for Daddy, 15 episodes of The Dick Van Dyke Show, six episodes of Mannix and five episodes of The Odd Couple. He also played the parts of Dr Blinky and Ludicrous Lion in H.R. Pufnstuf (Walker Edmiston provided the voices). His final television role was in 1995 in an episode of Seinfeld.

He was nominated for an Emmy Award for his performance in the 1967 episode of Bob Hope Presents the Chrysler Theatre, Free of Charge.

Personal life and death
Silver was married to actress Gloria Manos from 1954 until her death in 1993. The couple had two daughters, Stephanie and Jennie.

Silver died of heart and kidney failure on February 1, 2003, at the age of 84.

Partial filmography
Film

Television

References

External links
 

1918 births
2003 deaths
People from East Chicago, Indiana
Male actors from Indiana
Deaths from kidney failure